Kiikka is a locality and former municipality in Pirkanmaa region, Finland. It was consolidated in 1981 with Keikyä into a municipality of Äetsä, which in turn, was consolidated with Vammala and Mouhijärvi into a town of Sastamala in 2009. Kiikka is located by the river Kokemäenjoki, about 10 kilometres south of the Sastamala town center.

History 
Kiikka was originally a part of Tyrvää, Turku and Pori Province, which was one of the 10 original sockens of the historical province of Satakunta. The parish of Kiikka was established in 1662, but the first church was built in the 15th century. The present Kiikka Church was completed in 1807. The Kiikka railway station by the Tampere–Pori railway was opened in 1895 and closed in 1987.

Kiikka is the birthplace of the politician Tuure Junnila, the historian Reino Kero, the scientist Eino Kulonen and the poet Kaarlo Sarkia.

References 

Villages in Finland
Former municipalities of Finland
Sastamala